Shakeel Ahmad is a Pakistani politician who was the Provincial Minister of Khyber Pakhtunkhwa for Revenue, in office from 29 August 2018 till 26 January 2020. He had been a member of the Provincial Assembly of Khyber Pakhtunkhwa from August 2018 till January 2023. He has served as the Minister for Public Health Engineering.

Previously, he was a member of the Provincial Assembly of Khyber Pakhtunkhwa from May 2013 to May 2018 and served as special assistant to the Chief minister on Population Welfare for the same period.

Political career
He was elected to the Provincial Assembly of Khyber Pakhtunkhwa as a candidate of Pakistan Tehreek-e-Insaf (PTI) from Constituency PK-99 (Malakand Protected Area-II) in 2013 Pakistani general election. He received 27,312 votes and defeated Muhammad Humayun Khan, a candidate of Pakistan Peoples Party (PPP).

On 19 January 2013, he was inducted into the provincial Khyber Pakhtunkhwa cabinet of Chief Minister Pervez Khattak and was appointed as special assistant to the chief minister on population welfare.

He was re-elected to the Provincial Assembly of Khyber Pakhtunkhwa as a candidate of PTI from Constituency PK-18 (Malakand Protected Area-I) in 2018 Pakistani general election.

On 29 August 2018, he was inducted into the provincial Khyber Pakhtunkhwa cabinet of Chief Minister Mahmood Khan and was appointed as Provincial Minister of Khyber Pakhtunkhwa for Revenue.

He got the portfolio of Minister for Public Health Engineering on 20 May 2021.

References

Living people
Pashtun people
Khyber Pakhtunkhwa MPAs 2013–2018
People from Malakand District
Pakistan Tehreek-e-Insaf MPAs (Khyber Pakhtunkhwa)
Khyber Pakhtunkhwa MPAs 2018–2023
Year of birth missing (living people)